"Los Ageless" is a song by the American musician St. Vincent. It was released on September 6, 2017, through Loma Vista as the second single from her fifth studio album, Masseduction.

Composition
"Los Ageless" is a dance-rock, new wave, and electropop song driven by, "the flat thwack of electronic drums and a squirting synth-bass sound" while Clark "slathers distorted guitar lines on top of this foundation." Stereogum's Tom Breihan described the song is nothing like Clark has ever done before, further stating, "the title might make the song seem like a companion piece, but it's actually a pulsing, synthetic, slightly funky piece of new wave." Andrew Trendell of NME stated that, "'Los Ageless' [is] fuelled by a rush of industrial electro beats and fuzzy guitar," while seeing Clark "further blurring the boundaries of genre as the stomp of the track builds towards an almighty and feral climax."

Accolades

Music video
An accompanying music video for "Los Ageless" was released on October 3, 2017. The video was directed by Willo Perron. In the video, Clark "parodies the lives of Los Angeles socialites (yoga classes, plastic surgery, etc.) in a gruesome, pastel fashion."

Personnel
Credits adapted from Masseduction booklet.

Musicians
 Annie Clark – guitar, vocals
 Tuck Andress – guitar
 Patti Andress – vocals
 Greg Leisz – pedal steel
 Jack Antonoff – synths, programming
 Evan Smith – saxophone

Technical
 Laura Sisk – engineering
 Jack Antonoff – additional engineering
 Annie Clark – additional engineering
 Sean Cook – additional engineering
 Tom Elmhirst – mixing
 Brandon Boost – mix engineering
 Chris Gehringer – mastering

Charts

Release history

Alternate version
An acoustic version (featuring only Clark's vocals and acoustic piano) was released in October 2018 on MassEducation, an "acoustic reworking" of the entire Masseduction album.

Other media
The song was featured in the fifth season premiere of the Netflix animated show BoJack Horseman. English rock band the Wombats covered the song in 2018.

References

2017 songs
2017 singles
St. Vincent (musician) songs
American new wave songs
Dance-rock songs
Electropop songs
Loma Vista Recordings singles
Songs written by St. Vincent (musician)
Song recordings produced by Jack Antonoff
Songs about Los Angeles